Jaiprakash Rengarajan (born 30 October 1974), known professionally as JP, is an Indian producer and a self-made entrepreneur. He is the CEO of All Around Globe, based out of India (Mumbai), Europe (Portugal, Switzerland), which provides one-stop solutions for film shooting, destination marketing, event management, sports logistics, and visa services across the globe. He worked in the Tamil, Telugu, Hindi, Kannada, Bengali, and Punjabi movie industries.

Early life
Jaiprakash was born in Bangalore, India. After losing his mother at the age of two, he was adopted by Rengarajan Venguduswamy and Rajam Rengarajan (His biological father's elder brother and his wife). He was the fourth and last kid in the house. He grew up in a traditional Tamil household, traveling and studying in different places in Tamil Nadu because of his father's job. 

Even as a boy, he loved movies and always wanted to be integral to the movie-making process. He holds an Engineering degree in Electronics and Communication and a Post Graduate Diploma in Business Management from VPM Institute of Management. He has done multiple jobs, including working in a Telephone booth, taking freelance work for fencing, and electrical works, setting up cable TV connections, and running many other errands to be independent at a very young age.

He started his career as a Sales Executive at United Distillers and Ventures from 1996 to 1999, as Senior Executive (Marketing) – at Hindustan Coca-Cola Marketing Co. Pvt. Ltd from 1999 to 2003, and as Assistant Manager (Sales) – at Triumph Distillers and Ventures (UB Group) from 2003 to 2005. During these years, he earned an excellent reputation as a master brand builder, raising the profiles of brands like Smirnoff, Johnnie Walker, Ciroc, Baileys, and many Coca-Cola brands. His most remarkable work was with Kingfisher Airlines, where he launched over 85 national and international sectors. His last assignment as an employee was with TMIC as a Head of Marketing and Film Tourism.

Entrepreneurship 

He handled grand events like IPL season 2 and gave 5000 Indian cricket fans a gala time in South Africa. He spearheaded the launch of the Force India F1 team in India and the UK. He is known for his out-of-the-box event ideas that once included camels and Kathakali dancers inside an airport. All Around Globe, under his leadership, was the official logistics partner for the Hockey India League in 2013, 2014, and 2015.

Under his leadership, All Around Globe handled film shootings for India's Biggest Production houses like Yash Raj Films, Sony Entertainment, Annapurna studios, Rajkamal films international, Friday Filmworks, Filmkraft productions, Excel Entertainment, and many more. JP worked with re-owned, big-fame stars like Aamir Khan, Akshay Kumar, Allu Arjun, Hrithik Roshan, Kamalhassan, Katrina Kaif, Nagarjuna Akkineni, Rajinikanth, Rakul Preet singh, Ram Charan Teja, Ravi Teja, Suriya, Vijay to name a few. He worked as an International line producer for many famous Indian movies, including Dhoom 3, Baby, Krrish 3, WAR, and Vishwaroopam 2.

Jaiprakash Rengarajan was invited to Rashtrapati Bhavan to attend the dinner meeting with The honourable Presidents of India and Portugal on 14 February 2020.

About All Around Globe
All Around Globe(AAG) is a go-to place for all the film, events, logistics, and visa-related requirements. From scouting the locations to managing end-to-end logistics and moderating between the client and the foreign supplier to getting unmatched deals or providing Cineflex ultra-stable camera systems, the team will leave no stone unturned to ensure groundbreaking production quality while being time-efficient and cost-effective.

All Around Globe as an organization handled filmmaking in 25+ countries to date. They currently have a strong focus and expertise in the below verticals

1.	Film logistics 

2.	Sports management 

3.	Visa Logistics

4.	Destination wedding

5.	Destination management company 

6.	Sports gear logistics

Personal life 
JP lives with his wife and son in Thane, Mumbai. His wife, Anuradha Jaiprakash, is an artist and founder of discover artist art academy. His son Abhijay Jaiprakash is a young buddies author and has published a book, "The Chronicles of Kumari Kandam."

Filmography

Social work 

JP has travelled the world, been part of so many cultures, faced hardships, and tasted success. Yet, he believes in not forgetting the roots, and his philosophy goes like this “I don’t know where I come from, and I don’t know where I am going to be. It’s going to be a short span on this earth, so leave footsteps behind and touch people’s lives in the most positive ways.”

All Around Globe is currently associated with Pant Maharaj Vidhya Mandir and Balekundri school where he supports to run the schools and aids in setting up computer labs. They also run free summer camps for kids, near Ganesh puri and surrounding villages.

References

External links
 Official Website

Film producers from Bangalore
Living people
1974 births
Kannada film producers
Telugu film producers
Tamil film producers
Bengali film producers
Hindi film producers